Paule Charlotte Marie Jeanne Maurice (29 September 1910 – 18 August 1967) was a French composer.

Life and career
Maurice was born in Paris to Raoul Auguste Alexandre Maurice and Marguerite Jeanne Lebrun. Registration lists at the Conservatoire National Supérieur de Musique de Paris report that her father was an office worker and state only that the two were married.

Her most famous composition is the suite Tableaux de Provence pour saxophone et orchestre written between 1948 and 1955 dedicated to saxophone virtuoso, Marcel Mule. It is most often heard as a piano reduction. It was premiered on 9 December 1958 by Jean-Marie Londeix with the Orchestre Symphonique Brestois directed by Maurice's husband, and fellow composer, Pierre Lantier.

Maurice's other compositions include Suite pour quatuor de flûtes, Volio, Cosmorama, Concerto pour piano et orchestre, Mémoires d'un chat, Trois pièces pour violon, and many more. There are more titles catalogued in the library of the Conservatoire National Supérieur de Musique de Paris where Maurice studied and spent her professional life. Paule Maurice's teachers included Jean Gallon (Harmony), Noël Gallon (Counterpoint and Fugue) and Henri Büsser (Composition). From 1933 to 1947 Maurice was Jean Gallon's teaching assistant. She received first prize of harmony in 1933, second prize of fugue in 1934, and in 1939 received first prize in composition. In 1942, Maurice was appointed Professor of Déchiffrage (sight-reading), and in 1965 became Professor of Harmonic Analysis at l'École Normale de Musique. Maurice taught many students who became professors to the Conservatoire National Supérieur de Musique de Paris with some winning the Prix de Rome (saxame.org).

Maurice and Pierre Lantier wrote a treatise on harmony entitled Complément du Traité d'Harmonie de Reber that became an important reference work in France and abroad. It was intended to be used in conjunction with the 1862 treatise of Napoléon Henri Reber entitled Traité d'Harmonie.  The impact of Stravinsky, Debussy, and Ravel had created the need to update harmonic analysis.

Paule Maurice died at age 56 in Paris.

List of works 
Works list derived from Paule Maurice's 1960 curriculum vitae :

 Symphonie (1939)
 Concerto giocoso pour piano et orchestre (1950)
 Concerto (Concertino) pour piano et orchestre (1955)
 2 ballets ("Cosmorama" - Commande de l’État; "Idylle exotique") 
 Poème symphonique ("L’Embarquement pour Cithère" - Commande de l’État)
 Tableaux de Provence, suite pour saxophone et orchestre (1948-1955)
 3 Suites d’orchestre ("Quartier latin", "Tourisme", "Night Club chez Belzébuth")
 Quatuor de flûtes 
 Quatuor à cordes 
 Trio pour anches 
 Suite pour 2 pianos (9 pièces) 
 Variations pour piano 
 5 Pièces pour piano (Ed. Durand)
 9 Pièces pour piano (Ed. Leduc) 
 6 Pièces pour piano (Ed. P. Noël)
 5 Préludes pour piano (Ed.Fongères)
 3 Pièces violon piano (Ed. Noël) 
 Mélodies (NOËL) 
 Musiques de scène (Incidental music for: "Les caprices de Marianne", "On ne badine pas avec l'amour", "Watheau", "Patounet")
 Pièces pour flûte
 Pièces pour saxophone
 Pièces pour clarinette 
 Chœurs mélodies

In preparation at the time of her 1960 curriculum vitae : Suite pour 2 pianos et orchestre.

Compositions documented by academic database WorldCat:

 Tableaux de Provence
 Suite pour quatuor de flûtes
 Volio (saxophone etude)
 Mémoires d'un chat
 Concerto pour piano et orchestre
 Cosmorama
 Trois pièces pour violon

Awards

 Prix Halpheu (Composition)
 Prix du Congrès Marial de Boulogne pour une Cantate
 Prix pour l’ensemble de la composition féminine
 Prix du public et du Jury, Pasdeloup Orchestra
 Prix Georges Hüe pour la mélodie

References 

 Who is Paule Maurice? Her Relative Anonymity and its Consequences
 Complément du traité d'Harmonie de Reber 
 A Comprehensive Guide to the Saxophone Repertoire, 1844-2003 by Jean-Marie Londeix
 Jean-Marie Londeix: Master of the Modern Saxophone by James Umble
 Marcel Mule, His Life, and the Saxophone by Eugene Rousseau
 "Paule Maurice", in Sax, Mule & Co by Jean-Pierre Thiollet
 The Cambridge Companion to the Saxophone by Richard Ingham
  Sophie Levy, Archivist, Conservatoire National Supérieur de Musique de Paris
  Saxame.org

External links 
  http://www.paulemaurice.com
  http://studentsofpaulemaurice.ning.com
  https://web.archive.org/web/20090816093054/http://www.jm-londeix.com/en/index.htm
 Paule Maurice's 1960 curriculum vitae
  http://mediatheque.cnsmdp.fr/OPACWebAloes/OPAC/index.aspx?IdPage=33
  http://www.saxame.org
  http://www.di-arezzo.es/partituras-de-Paule+Maurice.html
  http://www.musimem.com/recherches.html
  http://www.musimem.com/obi-0997-0898.htm

1910 births
1967 deaths
Musicians from Paris
Conservatoire de Paris alumni
20th-century classical composers
French classical composers
French women classical composers
20th-century French women musicians
20th-century French composers
20th-century women composers